Kriegshoven Castle is a castle in Heimerzheim, Swisttal municipality, Germany.

History
The castle dates from at least the middle of the 13th century and was rebuilt in the 16th century. Its present appearance dates from another rebuilding scheme 1869. The castle is not open to the public.

References

External links

 
 

Water castles in North Rhine-Westphalia